The 2012 Summer Paralympics torch relay ran from 22 to 29 August 2012, prior to the 2012 Summer Paralympics. The relay began with four flames kindled on the highest peaks of the four nations of the United Kingdom, which were then brought to their respective capital cities for special events honouring the upcoming Games. For the relay proper, the four national flames were united at a ceremony in Stoke Mandeville in preparation for a final  journey to London.

Relay

Journey to Stoke Mandeville
The Paralympic torch relay began on 22 August. In a ceremony representing human endeavour, groups of disabled and non-disabled scouts kindled the four Paralympic flames on the highest peaks of each nation of the United Kingdom; Scafell Pike in England, Ben Nevis in Scotland, Slieve Donard in Northern Ireland, and Snowdon in Wales. The four flames were then brought down from each peak in lanterns. On 24 August the flames were used to light ceremonial cauldrons in their respective capital cities (London, Edinburgh, Belfast and Cardiff) during "Flame Festival" events. A total of 38 towns and cities also hosted "Flame Celebration" events over the bank holiday weekend, where community representatives collected a part of their nation's flame to bring back for their respective events.

Journey to London 

On 28 August a ceremony was held at Stoke Mandeville Stadium, in honour of Stoke Mandeville's significance to the Paralympic movement, where the four national flames were united in a cauldron at precisely 8:12 pm (20:12) to form a single flame for the relay. The four flames were brought into the stadium by dignitaries, including English Charity Campaigner, TV Presenter And Former model Katie Piper (who began to campaign for burns victims after having acid thrown in her face in 2009 By Starting Her Own Charity The Katie Piper Foundation), former Paralympian Chris Channon, nominated as a Torchbearer for his work on the Pegasus 999 PIN Database, a project designed to make the emergency call system more accessible for disabled and vulnerable people and Scottish amateur boxer Jonjo Look (who had a leg amputated and replaced by a prosthesis following an accident filling a gas canister).

The flame travelled a  route to the Olympic Stadium in a 24-hour relay, with 580 torchbearers working in teams of five. It travelled through iconic areas of London such as Abbey Road and London Zoo. Poor weather caused a two-hour delay on the Wednesday before the Games; parts of the route were modified to help ensure it would reach the stadium in time, while a backup flame was taken straight to the stadium as a contingency. However, as the opening ceremony's parade of nations took longer than expected, the flame was able to arrive at Olympic Stadium in time.

End of relay
The final three torchbearers represented three generations of Paralympic athletes. The torch entered the Olympic Stadium via a zipline attached to ArcelorMittal Orbit, carried by Joe Townsend, a former Royal Marine with amputated legs. Townsend represented the future as an athlete planning to compete in 2016 Summer Paralympics, a plan that came to fruition when he represented Great Britain in triathlon in Rio. He passed the torch to David Clarke, long-time captain of Britain's Five-a-side football team, representing the present. With his guide, Clarke passed the torch to Margaret Maughan, the winner of Great Britain's first gold medal at the 1960 Summer Paralympics, representing the past.

Route in the UK

The Torches 

The Paralympic torch was designed by Edward Barber and Jay Osgerby, who had also designed the Summer Olympic torch. It was intended to have a "modern" and "innovative" look, and was constructed with an aluminium alloy skin that is perforated to help with heat dissipation and grip. The torch also had a reflective finish, allowing it to match its surroundings and provide better visibility at night.

See also
 2012 Summer Olympics torch relay
 2010 Winter Paralympics torch relay
 2008 Summer Paralympics torch relay

References

External links
Torch route

Torch relay
Paralympic torch relays